is a Japanese former wrestler who competed in the 1996 Summer Olympics.

References

External links
 

1970 births
Living people
Place of birth missing (living people)
Olympic wrestlers of Japan
Wrestlers at the 1996 Summer Olympics
Japanese male sport wrestlers
Olympic bronze medalists for Japan
Olympic medalists in wrestling
Asian Games medalists in wrestling
Wrestlers at the 1994 Asian Games
Medalists at the 1996 Summer Olympics
Medalists at the 1994 Asian Games
Asian Games silver medalists for Japan
20th-century Japanese people
21st-century Japanese people